Piccolino is a studio album by the Italian singer, Mina. It was released by PDU on November 22, 2011. There are two versions of the album, the "standard edition" with 10 tracks, and the "deluxe edition" with those same songs plus 4 bonus tracks.

The album was certified gold by the Federation of the Italian Music Industry.

Track listing

Certifications

References

External links
Mina Mazzini official website

2011 albums
Mina (Italian singer) albums